John Becket (died 1416) was a grocer and merchant, and the member of the Parliament of England for Salisbury for the parliaments of 1407 and April and November 1414. He was also reeve and mayor of Salisbury.

References 

Members of Parliament for Salisbury
Year of birth unknown
Reeves (England)
English merchants
Mayors of Salisbury
Grocers
1416 deaths
English MPs 1407
English MPs April 1414
English MPs November 1414